The John Player Classic was the richest golf tournament in Britain between 1970 and 1973. In 1972 and 1973 it was an event on the fledgling European Tour.

The John Player Classic was first played in 1970 at Notts Golf Club (Hollinwell), when Ireland's Christy O'Connor Snr triumphed by one stroke over England's Tony Jacklin to collect the £25,000 first prize. Having not been held in 1971, the tournament returned as part of the new European Tour in 1972. It also had a change of venue, being moved to Turnberry on the west coast of Scotland.

The tournament was played just once more, in 1973, when American Charles Coody took the title. The second round featured some of the worst conditions ever seen in a professional golf tournament, with a gale-force wind gusting up to 65 mph, and rain falling horizontally. Marquees and hoardings were destroyed, with several exhibitors tents being uprooted and flung onto the course.

It was cancelled the following year because of a clash of dates with the PGA Tour's Kaiser International Open Invitational.

Winners

References

External links
Coverage on the European Tour's official site

Former European Tour events
Golf tournaments in the United Kingdom
1970 establishments in Scotland
Recurring sporting events established in 1970
1973 disestablishments in England
Recurring events disestablished in 1973